Burdick South Peak rises 544 m and is formed by an offshoot extending 1 km west-southwestwards from the southeastern extremity of Burdick Ridge in eastern Livingston Island.  The peak is narrow, with steep and partly ice-free southern and northern slopes. It is linked to Willan Nunatak by Willan Saddle.

The feature takes its name from Burdick Peak.

Location

The peak was mapped by the Spanish Servicio Geográfico del Ejército in 1991. Co-ordinates, elevation and distances given according to a 1995-96 Bulgarian topographic survey.

Maps
 L.L. Ivanov et al. Antarctica: Livingston Island and Greenwich Island, South Shetland Islands. Scale 1:100000 topographic map. Sofia: Antarctic Place-names Commission of Bulgaria, 2005.
 L.L. Ivanov. Antarctica: Livingston Island and Greenwich, Robert, Snow and Smith Islands. Scale 1:120000 topographic map.  Troyan: Manfred Wörner Foundation, 2009.

References
 Burdick South Peak. SCAR Composite Gazetteer of Antarctica
 Bulgarian Antarctic Gazetteer. Antarctic Place-names Commission. (details in Bulgarian, basic data in English)

External links
 Burdick South Peak. Copernix satellite image

Mountains of Livingston Island